I Married An Angel is a 1938 musical comedy by Rodgers and Hart.  It was adapted from a play by Hungarian playwright János Vaszary, entitled Angyalt Vettem Felesegul. The book was by Richard Rodgers and Lorenz Hart, with music by Rodgers and lyrics by Hart.  The story concerns a wealthy banker who, disillusioned with women, decides that the only mate for him would be an angel.  An angel soon arrives, and he marries her, but finds out that her perfection and guilelessness are inconvenient.

Synopsis
A wealthy Budapest banker, Count Willie Palaffi, is love-weary.  He ends his engagement to Anna Murphy, swearing that the only girl he could marry would be an angel.  A real angel soon flies into his life, and he marries her.  It turns out, however, that she is free of the human failings that permit people to tolerate each other.  In particular, she is unable to fib. Her honesty alienates Willie's high society acquaintances and his biggest customer and causes a run on his bank. His sister, Countess Palaffi, saves the day by teaching the angel about the real world. She also bribes taxi drivers to make Willie's creditors late, so that he has time to save his bank.  Willie and his now Earthier angel live happily ever after.

Productions
I Married An Angel opened at the Shubert Theatre on May 11, 1938 and closed on February 25, 1939 after 338 performances, followed by an extensive tour.  It was directed by newcomer Joshua Logan, with choreography by George Balanchine, scenic design by Jo Mielziner, and costume design by John Hambleton.  The cast included Dennis King as Willi, Vera Zorina as Angel, Vivienne Segal as Peggy, Walter Slezak as Harry, Charles Walters as Peter and Audrey Christie as Anna.

Two productions were mounted in 1964: one at Valley Forge Music Fair starring Don Ameche, Margaret Whiting and Taina Elg, and a second at the Royal Poinciana Plaza Playhouse starring Elaine Stritch, Clifford David and Taina Elg. In 1977, the musical was produced at the Berskshire Theatre Festival starring Phyllis Newman, Terence Monk and Valerie Mahaffey.  New York staged readings were presented by the New Amsterdam Theatre Company (1986) with Phyllis Newman, Kurt Peterson, and Karen Ziemba; and by the Rodgers & Hart Rediscovered concert series (1995) with Jason Graae, Kim Criswell, Victoria Clark and Marin Mazzie.  The musical was also presented as a staged reading by San Francisco's 42nd Street Moon theatre company in 1995 and again in 2000  and by Musicals Tonight!, New York City, as a staged concert in 2000.
It was staged by New York City Center's "Encores!" in March 2019.

Film and radio
In 1942, MGM made the musical into a musical film starring Jeanette MacDonald and Nelson Eddy.  A 1952 radio production starred Gordon MacRae and Lucille Norman was also produced.

Songs
Act 1 
Waltz (Opening Act I) - Orchestra     
Did You Ever Get Stung? – Count Willy Palarffi, Countess Peggy Palarffi and Peter Mueller 
I Married an Angel – Willy 
The Modiste – Willy, Angel, Modiste, 1st Venduse and 2nd Vendeuse 
Honeymoon Ballet - Angel, Willy, Premiere Danseur and Corps de Ballet
I'll Tell the Man in the Street – Peggy and Harry Mischka Szigetti 
How to Win Friends and Influence People – Anna Murphy, Peter and Ensemble 
Finale Act I – Willy, Peggy, Angel, Company
       
Act 2      
Spring Is Here – Willy and Peggy 
Angel Without Wings – Angel, Femme de Chambre, Clarinda, Philomena, Rosalina, Seronella, Arabella and Florabella 
A Twinkle in Your Eye – Peggy 
I'll Tell the Man in the Street (Reprise) – Harry 
At the Roxy Music Hall – Anna
Roxy's Music Hall (Snow Ballet) - Willy, Angel, Peggy, Anna, and Company
Finale Act II – Company

Note: The following earlier Rodgers and Hart songs were also included in the score: "Women Are Women", "Men of Milwaukee" and "Othello".

References

External links
 
 Overview of musical
I Married An Angel at RNH
 1942 film version at Jeanette MacDonald and Nelson Eddy: A Tribute

Angels in popular culture
1938 musicals
Broadway musicals
Musicals based on plays
Films with screenplays by Anita Loos
Musicals by Rodgers and Hart
Hungary in fiction